Irene Corbally Kuhn (15 January 1898 – 30 December 1995) was a journalist and author, whose career spanned seven decades in five continents. She became famous in the 1920s and '30s by working as a reporter for many newspapers in the United States and China. Mrs. Kuhn was a woman of many "firsts", among others, she was the first woman to broadcast from the Orient and the first individual to broadcast from a US Navy vessel. In addition to countless columns for numerous newspapers, she also wrote a memoir, a documentary and a screen-play.

Awards
 1977: Front Page Award for best magazine feature article

Publications 
 With

References

External Links 

 Irene Kuhn Papers at the University of Wyoming - American Heritage Center
 Select Digital Collection of Irene Kuhn Papers - AHC digital collections
 Blog entries about Kuhn at the AHC blog

1898 births
1995 deaths
American journalists
American women journalists
American columnists
American women columnists
20th-century American women
20th-century American people